Bear Creek is a tributary of the Salmon River in the Central Oregon Coast Range in the United States. It begins in the Siuslaw National Forest and flows generally northwest through Lincoln County to meet the river between Rose Lodge and Otis. Named tributaries from source to mouth are McMullen, Tarry, Southman, and Morton creeks.

A covered bridge over Bear Creek is made from timbers salvaged from the former Drift Creek Bridge, also in Lincoln County. In 1988, county officials closed the old bridge after rot and insect damage made it unsafe. In 2000, the Sweitz family rebuilt the bridge and granted a permanent public easement for its use. 
The bridge carries North Rogers Lane, off Bear Creek Road, over the creek.

See also
 List of rivers of Oregon

References

Rivers of Oregon
Oregon Coast Range
Rivers of Lincoln County, Oregon